The Aylesworth Apartments is a 19th century apartment building in the Upper South Providence neighborhood of Providence, Rhode Island. Since 1982, the building has been listed on the National Register of Historic Places.

Description 
It is a 2-1/2 story structure, built in brick on the first floor, and with its upper floors finished in slate.  It has a busy roofline, typical of the Queen Anne style popular when it was built in 1888–89.  Its main entry is recessed under a large round archway which also has a small second-story porch under it.  The building originally housed four apartments, but was altered in 1978 to house professional offices.  It is the oldest known building built as an apartment house in the city.

The building was listed on the National Register of Historic Places in 1982.

Original owner 
Eli Aylesworth (1802–1894) built the apartments as an investment. Aylesworth, since 1858, had been president of the Westminster Bank and lived a block east on Broad Street, in a single-family dwelling long since demolished. His firsts tenants here were his peers, at least economically.

See also
National Register of Historic Places listings in Providence, Rhode Island

References

Residential buildings on the National Register of Historic Places in Rhode Island
Buildings and structures in Providence, Rhode Island
National Register of Historic Places in Providence, Rhode Island